Quercus franchetii, commonly known as the zhui lian li evergreen oak, is a species of oak in the Ilex section of the genus, native to a wide area of eastern Asia.

Description 
Sometimes it is shrubby. When older, it has irregular and tortuous branches. The branches are covered with a creamy white, long lasting tomentum. The buds are small, globular with pointed apex, reddish and white ciliated edge.

They have a cuneate (wedge-shaped) or slightly rounded base, and the upper surface is smooth and shiny, while the underside is densely covered with yellowish fur. The leaf margin is dentate, with 5 to 10 pairs of short teeth, though not near the base, and the leaf sits on a 1–2-cm long furry gray-yellow petiole. The fruit is an acorn which measures 0.9–1.1 cm in length by 0.8 cm across; ovoid, apex depressed but mucronate; silky; short peduncle (1.5–3 cm); enclosed two-thirds by cup; cup 0.8–1.1 cm in diameter, scaly; maturing in 1 or 2 years.

Taxonomy 
This species was described in 1899 and dedicated to Adrien René Franchet, a botanist at the Muséum national d'histoire naturelle in Paris. Franchet had a few months earlier named and described this species as Q. lanuginosa, but his name turned out to have been used before, so Skan renamed it as Q. franchetii. It is in subgenus Cerris, section Ilex, resembling Q. lanata.

References

External links
 line drawing, Flora of China Illustrations vol. 4, fig. 366, 4-6 

franchetii
Plants described in 1899
Trees of Asia
Flora of Indo-China